The Port of Cagliari is one of the largest Italian seaports and one of the largest seaports in the Mediterranean Sea basin, with an annual traffic capacity of around 50 million tonnes of cargo and 1,000,000 TEU's.

The port is also an important employer in the area, with more than 3,000 employees who provide services to more than 5,500 ships every year.

History
The Port of Cagliari is in the west of the Mediterranean Sea, a position which has made it a commercial and strategic junction for over 2,500 years. Founded by the Phoenicians, launched by the Carthaginians and flourished under the Romans, for centuries the port in Cagliari has been in a continuous expansion program.

Thanks to the large spaces available and its enormous operating potential, the Port of Cagliari can accommodate heavy commercial traffic by moving conventional goods, bulk goods, Ro-Ro traffic and transshipping containerized goods, all which are flanked by passenger services, fishing, yachting and cruise activities.

On 20 June, 2019, the Cict, a subsidiary of the Contship Italia Group, announced the full dismission of its activities in the Porto Canale after 23 years of operations and the start of a collective firing procedure for the around 200-300 workers of the company.

Description
The Port of Cagliari is situated 18 km from the Gibraltar-Suez ideal line and represents one of the poles for transshipping activities in the Western Mediterranean sea.

The territorial district managed by the Cagliari Port Authority extends for approximately 30 km of coastline; its structure is divided into two areas: the historic port and the canal port.

The historic port has 5,800 meters of quay, which serves commercial and Ro-Ro traffic as well as passenger ships.
The canal port has 1,600 meters of quay and has five berths for transshipping and Ro-Ro traffic.

These two ports are flanked by berths for the petrochemical and oil industry, which accommodate mooring for 17 ships at a time.

Statistics
In 2007 the Port of Cagliari handled 35,261,756 tonnes of cargo and 547,336 TEU's making it one of the busiest cargo ports in Italy and one of the largest container ports in the country.

* figures in tonnes

Terminals

Container
The Cagliari International Container Terminal or (CICT) is the largest container terminal in the port with an annual traffic capacity of 1,000,000 TEU's.

References

Ports and harbours of Italy
Cagliari
Transport in Sardinia
Buildings and structures in Sardinia